Johann Sebastian Bach composed the church cantata  (Now come, Savior of the heathens), 61, in Weimar for the first Sunday in Advent, the Sunday which begins the liturgical year, and first performed it on  1714.

The cantata text was provided by Erdmann Neumeister, who quoted the Book of Revelation and framed his work by two hymn stanzas, the beginning of Martin Luther's "", the main hymn for Advent with a melody based on Medieval chant, and the end from Philipp Nicolai's "". The librettist quoted developed his thoughts like a sermon. Bach structured the cantata in six movements, beginning with a chorale fantasia, followed by a series of alternating recitatives and arias, and concluded by a four-part chorale. He scored it for three vocal soloists (soprano, tenor and bass), strings and continuo. Bach led the first performance on 2 December 1714. As , director of music of the main churches of Leipzig, he performed the cantata again on 28 November 1723.

History and words 

On 2 March 1714 Bach was appointed concertmaster of the Weimar court capelle of the co-reigning dukes Wilhelm Ernst and Ernst August of Saxe-Weimar. As concertmaster, he assumed the principal responsibility for composing new works, specifically cantatas for the ' (palace church), on a monthly schedule.

The exact chronological order of Bach's Weimar cantatas remains uncertain. Only four bear autograph dates. BWV 61 is dated 1714 and bears the liturgical designation "", the First Sunday of Advent. The prescribed readings for the Sunday were from the Epistle to the Romans, "now is our salvation nearer", and from the Gospel of Matthew, the Entry into Jerusalem.

 
The cantata text was provided by Erdmann Neumeister, published in Geistliche Poesien in Frankfurt in 1714. He began and ended his work with a hymn stanza. "" is the main hymn for Advent, which Martin Luther had derived from the Latin . Its melody is based on Medieval chant and supplies a "dark, imposing character". The librettist quoted the Book of Revelation in the fourth movement: "" – "Behold, I stand at the door and knock. Anyone that hears My voice and opens the door, to him I will enter and keep the evening meal with him and he with me.". The poet combined the ideas of Jesus' entry into Jerusalem and his promise to return with an invitation to enter the heart of the individual Christian. He developed his thoughts like a sermon, as the Bach scholar Alfred Dürr notes: mentioning that the arrival of Jesus brings blessing every day (movement 2), a prayer that Jesus may come to his congregation (movement 2), and in response to his statement of being at the door (movement 4) the opening of the heart of the individual Christian who knows about his sinfulness (movement 5). Bach had set one text by Neumeister before, possibly by 1713, in his cantata Gleichwie der Regen und Schnee vom Himmel fällt, BWV 18.

Because of Bach's liturgical designation, the performance can be precisely dated to 2 December 1714. As , director of music of the main churches of Leipzig, Bach performed the cantata again on 28 November 1723, beginning the first liturgical year in the new position. Bach paid attention to the exceptional occasion at beginning of the liturgical year, also when he composed later the chorale cantata Nun komm, der Heiden Heiland, BWV 62 (1724), and Schwingt freudig euch empor, BWV 36 (1731), which are all inspired by Luther's hymn. Bach also began his  by a setting of the same tune. In Leipzig, the first Sunday in Advent was the last chance to hear cantata music before Christmas, because tempus clausum was observed during Advent.

Music

Structure and scoring 

Bach structured the cantata in six movements, beginning with chorale fantasia, followed by a series of alternating recitatives and arias and concluded by a chorale. He scored it for three vocal soloists (soprano (S), tenor (T) and bass (B)), and a Baroque instrumental ensemble of violins (Vl), two violas (Va), and basso continuo (Bc), including cello (Vc) and bassoon (Fg). The autograph score is titled: "Dominica 1. Adventus Xsti. / Nun komm der Heyden Heyland. / â . / due Violini / due Viole / Violoncello / è & / Fagotto. / Sopr: Alto. Tenore è Baßo / Col' / Organo. / da / Joh Sebast Bach / anno. / 1714". The duration is given as 18 minutes. According to the Bach scholar Christoph Wolff, the use of two viola parts is French style. Dürr notes that perhaps the strings were doubled by oboes, at least in the Leipzig performance, in a practise that was "not always marked in the score".

In the following table of the movements, the scoring, keys and time signatures are taken from Dürr, using the symbol for common time (4/4). The continuo, playing throughout, is not shown.

Movements

1 
The first Sunday of Advent begins the liturgical year. Bach marked it by creating the opening chorus, "" (Now come, Saviour of the Gentiles), as a chorale fantasia in the style of a French overture, which follows the sequence slow – fast (fugue) – slow. In a French opera performance, the King of France would have entered during the overture; Bach greets a different king. Two of the four lines of the chorale melody are combined in the first slow section, line three is treated in the fast section, and line four in the final slow section. The melody of line 1 is first presented in the continuo, then sung by all four voices one after another, accompanied by a solemn dotted rhythm in the orchestra. Line 2 is sung by all voices together, accompanied by the orchestra. Line 3 is a fast , with the instruments playing , marked "gai". Line 4 is set as line 2. Wolff notes that Bach possibly followed the model of an opera by Agostino Steffani, Henrico Leone, which uses a chorus in a French overture.

2 
This more lyrical style of recitative derives from early Italian operas and cantatas, where it was known as  – half aria.

3 
The tenor aria, "" (Come, Jesus, come to Your Church), is accompanied by the violins and violas in unison. It is written in the rhythm of a gigue, and the combination of voice, unison strings and continuo gives it the texture of a trio sonata. Dürr comments that the use of the unison string ritornello, played even during the vocal passages, provides a "rather pointedly strict and unified character". The musicologist Richard Taruskin commented: "This hybridization of operatic and instrumental styles is ... standard operating procedure in Bach's cantatas."

4 

The knocking on the door is expressed by  chords in the strings. Dürr notes: "The most expressive text-engendered declamation is here ingeniously melted down into a structure only ten bars long but of compelling musical logic." John Eliot Gardiner, who conducted the Bach Cantata Pilgrimage in 2000, compares it to an Emmaus scene in Bach's later cantata Bleib bei uns, denn es will Abend werden, BWV 6, the "post-Resurrection appearance to the disciples" in Halt im Gedächtnis Jesum Christ, BWV 67, even to "the entry of the Commendatore in Mozart’s opera Don Giovanni. Bach would later frequently use the bass as the voice of Christ, in his St Matthew Passion even with a similar string accompaniment.

5 
The response to the invitation is the individual prayer of the soprano, "" (Open, my whole heart). It is accompanied only by the continuo, with an adagio middle section.

6 
In the closing chorale, "" (Amen, amen! Come, you fair crown of joy), Bach sets the Abgesang only of the final stanza of Nicolai's hymn. The musicologist Julian Mincham offers the thought: "Conceivably the most convincing explanation lies, as it so often does, within the text– ... do not delay, I await You longingly. The hymn tune itself, through its very abbreviation implies a sense of urgency and the feeling of being unable to defer any longer." In Bach's setting, the violin adds a jubilant fifth part to the four vocal parts. The violin has to "climb three octaves to convey the extent of the soul's longing for the joys of a future life and the prospect of Jesus returning at the end of time".

Recordings 

The listing is taken from the selection on the Bach Cantatas Website. Vocal groups with one voice per part (OVPP) and instrumental groups playing period instruments in historically informed performances are marked by green background.

References

Sources 
 
 Nun komm, der Heiden Heiland BWV 61; BC A 1 / Sacred cantata (1st Sunday of Advent) Bach Digital
 BWV 61 Nun komm, der Heiden Heiland: English translation, University of Vermont

External links 
 Nun komm, der Heiden Heiland, BWV 61: performance by the Netherlands Bach Society (video and background information)

Church cantatas by Johann Sebastian Bach
1714 compositions
Advent music